Johnson Line was a Swedish shipping line founded in 1904 as a subsidiary of Rederi AB Nordstjernan. In 1982 Johnson Line absorbed Rederi AB Svea, another Rederi AB Nordstjernan -owned company, hence becoming a member of the Finnish-Swedish Silja Line consortium. Johnson Line ceased existing as an independent company in 1990 when it merged with the fellow Silja Line member to Effoa to form EffJohn.

References 
 Flags Of The World
 History of the Johnson Line
 Maritime Timetable Images

Shipping companies of Sweden